Harundale Mall, in Glen Burnie, Anne Arundel County, Maryland, United States at the intersection of Ritchie Highway and Aquahart Road, was the first enclosed, air-conditioned mall built east of the Mississippi River.

Originally built in 1958, the mall closed in 1997 and was demolished and redeveloped into Harundale Plaza, a shopping center anchored by Lidl and Regency Furniture.

History

Opening 
The mall opened on October 1, 1958. Developed by Community Research & Development Inc, headed by James W. Rouse and designed by architectural firm Rogers, Taliaferro, & Lamb, the fully enclosed and air-conditioned center, which was constructed at a cost of $10 million, was described as the first one of its kind on the east coast. Built around an existing group of six stores on the property, the mall consisted of a total of 350,000 square feet, and featured fountains and plants throughout the mall. The primary "Garden Court" featured a 35-foot cage of "Mynah birds", along with a staircase leading to a balcony restaurant over top a fountain. Major retailers included department stores Hochschild, Kohn, & Co and Brager's, a large Oppenheim Collins branch, both S.S. Kresge and G. C. Murphy variety stores, and Food Fair. Grand opening ceremonies, beginning at 9 AM, featured Governor Theodore McKeldin, James W, Rouse, president of Hochschild, Kohn, & Co Martin Kohn, and various other politicians, including then senator John F. Kennedy.

In 1959, Brager's would convert to the Brager-Gutman's name, with the two store's merger that year. A single screen theater, operated by General Cinemas, opened across from the mall in 1964. By 1971 the mall's Food Fair had also been converted to the new Pantry Pride name.

Missing persons 
The mall was connected to two missing persons cases, in 1969 and 1970. Twenty-year-old Joyce Malecki was last seen at the Harundale Mall on November 11, 1969; she was found dead two days later at a shooting range in Fort Meade, Maryland. The next year, 16-year-old Pamela Conyers was last known as having driven to the Harundale Mall on October 16, before her body was found four days later in a wooded area, near what is now the Waterford Road/Maryland Route 648 overpass along Maryland Route 100.

Changes and decline 
The mall's first renovation began on July 14, 1980. Done by Leblang & Associates, the $250,000 renovation consisted of a total repaint and re-tiling of the mall, in addition to a new "picnic area" in the south court, redesigned kiosks, and expanded planters and seating areas. The mall's Pantry Pride location was sold at auction in 1981 to E-Zee Markets, who went on to close the store in 1983. Hutzler's would acquire the Harundale Mall location of Hochschild, Kohn, & Co in 1984, with that location replacing their existing store at the Southdale Shopping Center. This location would become one of several announced to become "Hutzler's Value Way" in September 1988, before closing later that year. Value City took over the former Hutzler's space in 1989.

The mall, then at 80% occupancy, was put up for sale by owner The Rouse Company in 1995. The next year, McCrory announced it would close its Harundale store once it reached the end of its lease in October, as part of wider store closures as a result of their 1992 bankruptcy. The mall quietly closed in 1997, with only two exterior tenants including Value City staying open. This was followed by the sale of the property to Manekin Corp, who announced plans to demolish the mall and redevelop the property into a strip mall.

Redevelopment as Harundale Plaza 
By 1998 anchors for the strip mall had been announced, to include a Superfresh Supermarket and an expanded Value City, with both bank tenants at the former mall, First Union and Crestar, negotiating leases for new locations. Demolition began in March 1998, and was finished the next year. The final major store, AJWright, was announced in November 1999.

Value City closed its doors in order to be converted to Burlington Coat Factory, as part of a deal reached by owner Retail Ventures Inc to sell leases of up to 24 stores, in 2008. AJWright would be converted to HomeGoods in February 2011, and later that year, Superfresh would close its doors. Regency Furniture would later open in that space.

References 

Glen Burnie, Maryland
Shopping malls in Maryland
Demolished shopping malls in the United States
Shopping malls established in 1958
Shopping malls disestablished in 1998
1958 establishments in Maryland
1998 disestablishments in Maryland
Demolished buildings and structures in Maryland
Buildings and structures demolished in 1998